Cumpas Municipality is a municipality in Sonora in north-western Mexico.

Area and Population
The area of the municipality is 2,013.50 km2., which represents 1.09% of the state total and 0.10% of the national total. The most important settlements, besides the municipal seat, are Los Hoyos, Jecori, Ojo de Agua, Kilometro 5 and Teonadepa.  The municipal population was 5,776 in the 2005 count, which shows a decrease from 2000 when the census counted 6,202 inhabitants.  The municipal seat had a population of 2809 in 2000.

Location
Boundaries are with 
It is connected to the state capital of Hermosillo by Mex 17. See map at

Economic Activity
Agriculture is modest with corn and beans grown for subsistence and grasses grown for cattle fodder.  The cattle industry is more important with over 25,000 head counted in the 2000 census.   Calves are exported to the United States.  Mining is carried out with over 100 workers involved in this activity.

History
Originally the territory was occupied by the Opata teguimes Indians.  In 1643 the area was visited by  the Italian priest Tomás Basilio, and in 1643 the Jesuit missionary Egidio Monteffio founded the settlement with the name of Nuestra Señora de la Asunción de Cumpas.

References

Municipalities of Sonora